Liam O'Sullivan (28 October 1981 – 29 April 2002) was a Scottish football player, who played as a defender for Hibernian, Clydebank and Brechin City.

O'Sullivan achieved success in youth football with Hutchison Vale, and signed a five-year contract with Hibernian after leaving school in 1997. In May 2000, he joined Icelandic top division club Keflavík on loan. He went on to play seven league matches for the club, before being recalled by Hibernian manager Alex McLeish two months later. O'Sullivan played in the Scottish Football League for both Clydebank and Brechin City during 2000, but then suffered a serious knee injury. As he was battling to recover from that injury, O'Sullivan was found dead in a friend's house in Haddington. It was suspected that a drugs overdose, including methadone and ecstasy, was the cause of death.

References

External links

1981 births
2002 deaths
Footballers from Edinburgh
Scottish footballers
Association football defenders
Hibernian F.C. players
Knattspyrnudeild Keflavík players
Clydebank F.C. (1965) players
Brechin City F.C. players
Scottish Football League players
Scottish expatriate footballers
Expatriate footballers in Iceland
Drug-related deaths in Scotland
Lothian Thistle Hutchison Vale F.C. players